Levan Choladze (born April 9, 1978) is a Georgian politician and diplomat. He formerly served as Chairman of Chamber of Control of Georgia (2007-2008), Secretary of the National Security Council of Georgia from October to December 2005, and Deputy Minister of Foreign Affairs of Georgia (2006-2007)

Educational Background 

2003 - Attended NATO Defense College, (Rome, Italy).
Summer 2003 - Studied at York St. John College of the University of Leeds, School of International Education (Great Britain).
2002  - Royal Netherlands Military Academy, Georgian-Netherlands International Security Course.
2000  - graduated from faculty of International Law and International Relations, Tbilisi State University, majoring in International Law and was conferred qualification of Lawyer.

Professional experience 

2008-2011 - First Deputy Minister of Agriculture of Georgia.
2007-2008 - Chairman of the Chamber of Control of Georgia.
2005-2007 - Deputy Minister of Foreign Affairs.
October–December 2005  - National Security Advisor to the President of Georgia - Secretary of the National Security Council.
2004-2005 - First Deputy Secretary of the National Security Council.
June–October 2004 - Director of State and Public Security Department. NSC.
February–June 2004 - Head of Defense Minister's Office.
2003-2004 - Deputy Director of Defense Policy and International Relations Department. Ministry of Defense.
2002-2003 - Head of International Legal Division. Ministry of Defense.
1998–2002 - Different positions at the International Legal Division. Ministry of Defense.
1996–1998 - General Prosecutors Office of Georgia.

External links 
 Ministry of Agriculture

1978 births
Diplomats from Tbilisi
Jurists from Georgia (country)
Politicians from Tbilisi
Living people
Government ministers of Georgia (country)